Darun Kola-ye Gharbi (also Romanized as Darūn Kolā-ye Gharbī; also known as Darūn Kalā and Darūn Kolā) is a village in Babol Kenar Rural District, Babol Kenar District, Babol County, Mazandaran Province, Iran. At the 2006 census, its population was 1,057, in 271 families.

References 

Populated places in Babol County